Columbia is the capital of the U.S. state of South Carolina. With a population of 136,632 at the 2020 census, it is the second-largest city in South Carolina. The city serves as the county seat of Richland County, and a portion of the city extends into neighboring Lexington County. It is the center of the Columbia metropolitan statistical area, which had a population of 829,470 in 2020 and is 7th largest urban center in the Deep South and the 72nd-largest metropolitan statistical area in the nation. The name Columbia is a poetic term used for the United States, derived from the name of Christopher Columbus, who explored for the Spanish Crown. Columbia is often abbreviated as Cola, leading to its nickname as "Soda City."

It lies at the confluence of the Saluda River and the Broad River, which merge at Columbia to form the Congaree River. As the state capital, Columbia is the site of the South Carolina State House, the center of government for the state. In 1860, the South Carolina Secession Convention took place in Columbia; delegates voted for secession, making South Carolina the first state to leave the Union in the events leading up to the Civil War.

Columbia is home to the University of South Carolina, the state's flagship public university and the largest in the state. The area has benefited from Congressional support for Southern military installations. Columbia is the site of Fort Jackson, the largest United States Army installation for Basic Combat Training. Twenty miles to the east of the city is McEntire Joint National Guard Base, which is operated by the U.S. Air Force and is used as a training base for the 169th Fighter Wing of the South Carolina Air National Guard.

History

Early history

In May 1540, a Spanish expedition led by Hernando de Soto traversed what is now Columbia while moving northward on exploration of the interior of the Southeast. The expedition produced the earliest written historical records of this area, which was part of the regional Cofitachequi chiefdom of the Mississippian culture.

During the colonial era, European settlers encountered the Congaree in this area, who inhabited several villages along the Congaree River. The settlers established a frontier fort and fur trading post named after the Congaree, on the west bank of the Congaree River. It was at the fall line and the head of navigation in the Santee River system.

In 1754 the colonial government in South Carolina established a ferry to connect the fort with the growing European settlements on the higher ground on the east bank.

Like many other significant early settlements in colonial America, Columbia is on the fall line of the Piedmont region. The fall line is often marked by rapids at the places where the river cuts sharply down to lower levels in the Tidewater or Low Country of the coastal plain. Beyond the fall line, the river is unnavigable for boats sailing upstream. Entrepreneurs and later industrialists established mills in such areas, as the water flowing downriver, often over falls, provided power to run equipment.

Designation as state capital
After the American Revolutionary War and United States independence, State Senator John Lewis Gervais of the town of Ninety Six introduced a bill that was approved by the legislature on March 22, 1786, to create a new state capital. Considerable argument occurred over the name for the new city. According to published accounts, Senator Gervais said he hoped that "in this town we should find refuge under the wings of COLUMBIA", for that was the name which he wished it to be called. One legislator insisted on the name "Washington", but "Columbia" won by a vote of 11–7 in the state senate.

The site was chosen as the new state capital in 1786 due to its central location in the state. The State Legislature first met there in 1790. After remaining under the direct government of the legislature for the first two decades of its existence, Columbia was incorporated as a village in 1805 and then as a city in 1854.

Columbia received a large stimulus to development when it was connected in a direct water route to Charleston by the Santee Canal. This connected the Santee and Cooper rivers in a  section. It was first chartered in 1786 and completed in 1800, making it one of the earliest canals in the United States. With competition later from faster railroad traffic, it ceased operation around 1850.

The commissioners designed a town of 400 blocks in a  square along the river. As the capital and one of the first planned cities in the United States, Columbia began to grow rapidly. Its population was nearing 1,000 shortly after the start of the 19th century.

The commissioners constituted the local government until 1797, when a Commission of Streets and Markets was created by the General Assembly. Three main issues occupied most of their time: public drunkenness, gambling, and poor sanitation.

19th century

In 1801, South Carolina College (now the University of South Carolina) was founded in Columbia. The original building survives. The city was chosen as the site of the state college in an effort to unite residents of the Upcountry and the Lowcountry and to discourage elite youth from traveling to England for their higher education. At the time, South Carolina planter families sent more young men to England than did men of any other state. The leaders of South Carolina kept a close eye on the new college: for many years after its founding, commencement exercises were held in December while the state legislature was in session.

Columbia received its first charter as a town in 1805. An intendant and six wardens  governed the town. John Taylor, the first elected intendant, later served in both houses of the General Assembly, both houses of Congress, and eventually was elected as governor. By 1816, some 250 homes had been built in the town and a population was more than 1000.

In 1828, the South Carolina Female Collegiate Institute was founded by Elias Marks for the higher education of young women. (The word Collegiate was added to its charter in 1835.) Since the school was located on 500 acres in the Barhamville area of Columbia, it was often informally called Barhamville Institute or Barhamville Academy. "...it was the first and only school of its character at the South. It was of a very high class..." The Barhamville Institute closed in 1867 due to the economic dislocation of the Civil War.

Columbia became chartered as a city in 1854, with an elected mayor and six aldermen. Two years later, Columbia had a police force consisting of a full-time chief and nine patrolmen. The city continued to grow at a rapid pace, and throughout the 1850s and 1860s, Columbia was the largest inland city in the Carolinas. Railroad transportation served as a significant cause of population expansion in Columbia during this time. Rail lines that reached the city in the 1840s primarily transported cotton bales, not passengers, from there to major markets and the port of Charlestown. Cotton was the chief commodity of the state and lifeblood of the Columbia community; in 1850, virtually all of the city's commercial and economic activity was related to cotton. Cotton was sent to New York and New England's textile mills, as well as to England and Europe, where demand was high.

"In 1830, around 1,500 slaves lived and worked in Columbia; this population grew to 3,300 by 1860. Some members of this large enslaved population worked in their masters' households. Masters also frequently hired out slaves to Columbia residents and institutions, including South Carolina College. Hired-out slaves sometimes returned to their owners' homes daily; others boarded with their temporary masters."

Civil War 

Columbia was of considerable importance to the Confederacy during the American Civil War. Columbia was the site of the first Southern secession convention, which assembled in the First Baptist Church on December 17, 1860. Secession may well have been declared in Columbia, were it not for a smallpox outbreak which moved the convention partway through to Charleston, where South Carolina became the first state to secede from the Union on December 20. A considerable military infrastructure sprung up in Columbia. The state arsenal was located in Columbia, along with the state military academy. The grounds of the University of South Carolina were converted into a military hospital, since its role as an educational institution had been made moot after its entire student body volunteered for the Confederate Army. Numerous industrial facilities produced war materiel. By 1865, it was also the Confederacy's last breadbasket. All of these factors combined to make it the obvious next target for General William T. Sherman after his successful March to the Sea captured Savannah, Georgia.

The Union Army, under Gen. Sherman, captured the city on February 17, 1865. Much of the city was destroyed by fire between the 17th and 18th. The idea that General Sherman ordered the burning of Columbia has persisted as part of the Lost Cause of the Confederacy narrative. But modern historians have concluded that no one cause led to the burning of Columbia, and that Sherman did not order the burning. Rather, the chaotic atmosphere in the city on the occasion of its fall led to the ideal conditions for a fire to start and spread. As a newspaper columnist noted in 1874, "the war burned Columbia."

Reconstruction era and beyond 
During the Reconstruction era, when African-American Republicans were among the legislators elected to state government, Columbia became the focus of considerable attention. Reporters, journalists, travelers, and tourists flocked here to see a Southern state legislature whose members included freedmen (former slaves), as well as men of color who had been free before the war. The city began to rebuild and recover from the devastating fire of 1865; a mild construction boom took place within the first few years of Reconstruction. In addition, repair of railroad tracks in outlying areas created more jobs for residents.

By the late nineteenth century, culture was expanding in the city. In 1897 the Columbia Music Festival Association (CMFA) was founded by Mayor William McB. Sloan and the city aldermen. It was headquartered in the Opera House on Main Street, which also served as City Hall. Its role was to book and manage concerts and events in the opera house for the city.

20th century

During the early 20th century, Columbia developed as a regional textile manufacturing center. In 1907, Columbia had six mills in operation: Richland, Granby, Olympia, Capital City, Columbia, and Palmetto. Combined, they employed over 3,400 workers with an annual payroll of $819,000, giving the Midlands an economic boost of over $4.8 million. Columbia had no paved streets until 1908, when 17 blocks of Main Street were surfaced. But, it had 115 publicly maintained street crossings, boardwalks placed at intersections to keep pedestrians from having to wade through a sea of mud between wooden sidewalks. As an experiment, Washington Street was once paved with wooden blocks. This proved to be the source of much local amusement when they buckled and floated away during heavy rains. The blocks were replaced with asphalt paving in 1925.

During the years 1911 and 1912, some $2.5 million worth of construction occurred in the city, as investors used revenues generated by the mills. New projects included construction of the Union Bank Building at Main and Gervais, the Palmetto National Bank, a shopping arcade, and large hotels at Main and Laurel (the Jefferson) and at Main and Wheat (the Gresham). In 1917, the city was selected by the US Army to be developed as the site of Camp Jackson, a U.S. military installation that was officially classified as a "Field Artillery Replacement Depot". The first recruits arrived at the camp on September 1, 1917. In the first several decades of the 20th century, white Democrats of the Solid South controlled an outsize amount of power in the House and Senate. The former Confederate states had effectively disenfranchised most blacks and many poor whites through passage of discriminatory laws and constitutions that made voter registration and voting more difficult. But they controlled all the seats in Congress related to the total state populations.

In 1930, Columbia was the hub of a trading area with about 500,000 potential customers. It had 803 retail establishments, 280 of them being food stores. The city also had 58 clothing and apparel outlets, 57 restaurants and lunch rooms, 55 filling stations, 38 pharmacies, 20 furniture stores, 19 auto dealers, 11 shoe stores, nine cigar stands, five department stores, and one book store. Wholesale distributors located within the city numbered 119, with one-third of them dealing in food.

In 1934, the federal courthouse at the corner of Main and Laurel streets was purchased by the city for use as City Hall. Built of granite from nearby Winnsboro, Columbia City Hall is listed on the National Register of Historic Places. Designed by Alfred Built Mullett, President Ulysses S. Grant's federal architect, the building was completed in 1876. Mullet, best known for his design of the Executive Office Building in Washington, DC, had originally designed the courthouse with a clock tower. It was not constructed, perhaps because of large cost overruns on the project. Copies of Millet's original drawings can be seen on the walls of City Hall alongside historic photos of other Columbia beginnings. Federal offices were moved to the new J. Bratton Davis United States Bankruptcy Courthouse.

In 1940 Camp Jackson was reactivated after war started in Europe, and was designated as Fort Jackson. City leaders and the congressional delegation had lobbied to gain such a permanent military installation. In the early 1940s, shortly after the attack on Pearl Harbor, which catalyzed the entry of the US into World War II, Lt. Colonel Jimmy Doolittle and his group of now-famous pilots began training for the 1942 Doolittle Raid over Tokyo at what is now Columbia Metropolitan Airport. They trained in B-25 Mitchell bombers, the same model as the plane that is installed at Columbia's Owens Field in the Curtiss-Wright hangar.

During the 1940s African Americans increased activism for their civil rights: seeking to reverse Jim Crow laws and racial discrimination that pushed them into second-class status in Columbia and the state. In 1945, a federal judge ruled that the city's black teachers were entitled to equal pay to that of their white counterparts. But, in following years, the state attempted to strip many blacks of their teaching credentials. Other issues in which the blacks of the city sought equality concerned voting rights and segregation (particularly regarding public schools). In 1954, in Brown v. Board of Education, the US Supreme Court ruled that segregated public schools were unconstitutional.

On August 21, 1962, eight downtown chain stores served blacks at their lunch counters for the first time. The University of South Carolina, a public institution, admitted its first black students in 1963. Around that same time, many vestiges of segregation began to disappear from the city: blacks attained membership on various municipal boards and commissions, and the city adopted a non-discriminatory hiring policy. These and other such signs of racial progress helped earn the city the 1964 All-America City Award for the second time (the first being in 1951). A 1965 article in Newsweek lauded Columbia as a city that had "liberated itself from the plague of doctrinal apartheid".

Since the late 20th century, historic preservation has played a significant part in the city. The historic Robert Mills House was restored in 1967, which inspired the renovation and restoration of other historic structures, such as the Hampton-Preston House and others associated with President Woodrow Wilson, Maxcy Gregg, Mary Boykin Chesnut, and noted free black Celia Mann. In the early 1970s, the University of South Carolina initiated the refurbishment of its "Horseshoe". Several area museums also benefited from the increased historical interest of that time, among them the Fort Jackson Museum, the McKissick Museum on the campus of the University of South Carolina, and most notably the South Carolina State Museum, which opened in 1988.

Mayor Kirkman Finlay, Jr., was the driving force behind the refurbishment of Seaboard Park, now known as Finlay Park, in the historic Congaree Vista district. His administration developed the $60 million Palmetto Center package, which resulted in construction of an office tower, parking garage, and the Columbia Marriott hotel, which opened in 1983. In 1980, the Columbia metropolitan population reached 410,088, and in 1990, this figure had hit roughly 470,000. During the 1970s and 1980s skyscrapers were constructed and other real-estate development took place throughout Columbia. To meet demand of businesses, the city constructed The Tower at 1301 Gervais in 1973. In 1983, Hub at Columbia was constructed. In 1987, the Capitol Center was built, which became the tallest building in South Carolina. The Bank of America Plaza was built in 1989.

21st century and recent history

During the 1990s and early 2000s the city worked to revitalize the downtown, as businesses had been pulled out to the suburbs. The Congaree Vista district along Gervais Street, once known as a warehouse district, became an area of art galleries, shops, and restaurants. The Colonial Life Arena (formerly known as the Colonial Center) opened in 2002, and brought several major entertainers and shows to Columbia. EdVenture, the largest children's museum in the Southeast, opened in 2003. The Village at Sandhill shopping center opened in 2004 in Northeast Richland County.

The Columbia Metropolitan Convention Center opened in 2004, and a new convention center hotel opened in September 2007. A public-private City Center Partnership has been formed to implement the downtown revitalization and boost downtown growth. In 2009, Columbia's most recent skyscraper, the Tower at Main and Gervais, was completed. Mayor Stephen K. Benjamin started his first term in July 2010, elected as the first African-American mayor in the city's history.

Founders Park, home of USC baseball, opened in 2009. The South Carolina Gamecocks baseball team won two NCAA national championships in 2010 and in 2011. The 2010 South Carolina Gamecocks football team, under coach Steve Spurrier, earned their first appearance in the SEC championship. Historic flooding in the city in October 2015 forced the Gamecocks football team to move their October 10 home game. Segra Park (formerly Spirit Communications Park), home of the Columbia Fireflies, opened in April 2016. In 2017, the Gamecocks women's basketball team (under coach Dawn Staley) won their first NCAA championship, and the men's basketball team went to the Final Four for the first time. They won their second national championship in 2022.

A Mast General Store was opened in 2011. The Music Farm opened a location in Columbia on Senate Street in 2014. In 2000, the Confederate battle flag was moved from the South Carolina State House to the Confederate monument. On July 10, 2015, the flag was removed from the monument to a museum in the wake of the Charleston church shooting a month before by Columbia-born resident Dylann Roof. In 2017, the central path of a total solar eclipse passed directly over the city and state capitol.

In March 2019, the murder of Samantha Josephson gained national attention. In Five Points, a neighborhood in Columbia known for its late-night bars, Samantha Josephson mistakenly entered into a car she believed was her Uber. The driver, Nathaniel Rowland, killed Josephson, sparking laws around the United States to further regulate rideshare companies. In South Carolina, the Samantha L. Josephson Ridesharing Act requires rideshare drivers to display identifying lights and prohibits the misrepresentation of non-rideshare drivers as such. Similar laws passed in New Jersey, North Carolina, and New York State. Rowland was caught, convicted, and sentenced to two life sentences without the possibility of parole. On December 28, 2022, federal legislation authorizing a study of ride-sharing safety practices, with passage by the US House and Senate, was sent to President Biden's desk. 

In May 2019, 10,000 people marched at the Statehouse in the "All Out Rally" to protest issues surrounding education, including low teacher pay, high student-to-teacher ratios, and the general underfunding of education. The protest was led by SC for Ed, a left-learning state advocacy group for teachers.

Following the murder of George Floyd in May 2020, protests and riots spread to South Carolina and Columbia, which included the burning of several police cars and the breaking of business windows.

In 2021, Republican Daniel Rickenmann was elected mayor of Columbia, defeating Tameika Devine. He succeeded Stephen K. Benjamin, who did not seek reelection, in January 2022.

On April 16, 2022, a mass shooting at the Columbiana Centre in the Lexington County portion of the city resulted in the injuries of 14 people. 10 were struck by gunfire while four sustained stampede-related injuries. Three men were arrested; Columbia police declared that the shooting was the result of an argument, not a random attack or terrorism.

Geography

One of Columbia's more prominent geographical features is the fall line, the boundary between the upland Piedmont region and the Atlantic Coastal Plain, across which rivers drop as falls or rapids. Columbia developed at the fall line of the Congaree River, which is formed by the confluence of the Broad and Saluda rivers. The Congaree was the farthest inland point of river navigation. The energy of falling water also powered Columbia's early mills.

The city has capitalized on this location, which includes three rivers, by identifying as "The Columbia Riverbanks Region".

Soils in Columbia are well drained in most cases, with grayish brown loamy sand topsoil. The subsoil may be yellowish-red, sandy clay loam (Orangeburg series), yellowish-brown sandy clay loam (Norfolk series), or strong brown sandy clay (Marlboro series). All belong to the Ultisol soil order.

Approximately ⅔ of Columbia's land area, is contained within the Fort Jackson Military Installation, much of which consists of uninhabited training grounds.

Climate 
Columbia has a humid subtropical climate (Köppen Cfa), with relatively cool to mild winters and hot and humid summers. The area averages 55 nights below freezing and is subject to temporary cold spells during the winter, but extended cold or days where the temperature fails to rise above freezing are both rare. These cold snaps usually result from atmospheric troughs that bring in cold air from Canada across the Eastern part of the country. The USDA places Columbia in the 8a Hardiness Zone.

With an annual average of 5 days with + and 72 days with + temperatures, the city's current promotional slogan describes Columbia as "Famously Hot". In the summer months, Columbia usually has the greatest high temperature in the state. One reason for this is its low elevation in comparison to other cities at similar latitudes. For example, Atlanta has a significantly higher elevation, which helps to moderate its summer temperatures. Secondly, the city lies in the heart of the Sandhills region. Since the region's soils are more sandy, they contain less water and can warm up more quickly. This explains why usually only the high temperatures and not the low temperatures are much different from across the state. Thirdly, because of its distance from the Atlantic Ocean, it does not receive the same moderating effects of coastal cities like Charleston. Lastly, the city experiences the urban heat island effect, making it significantly warmer than some surrounding towns and cities.

Precipitation, at  annually, peaks in the summer months largely because of afternoon thunderstorms, and is the least during spring and fall. Snowfall averages , but is largely variable depending on the year. Snow flurries usually do fall at least once during the winter season during its coldest periods. Like much of the southeastern U.S., the city is prone to inversions, which trap ozone and other pollutants over the area.

Only one other sub-zero temperature has been recorded in Columbia:  on January 21, 1985.

Metropolitan area

The metropolitan statistical area of Columbia is the second-largest in South Carolina; it has a population of 817,488 according to the 2016 Census estimates.

Columbia's metropolitan counties include:

Richland County
Lexington County
Fairfield County
Calhoun County
Kershaw County

Columbia's suburbs and environs include:
St. Andrews, Richland County: Pop. 20,493 (unincorporated)
Seven Oaks, Lexington County: Pop. 15,144 (unincorporated)
Lexington: Pop. 17,870 (on Lake Murray)
Dentsville, Richland County: Pop. 14,062 (unincorporated)
West Columbia: Pop. 14,988
Cayce, Lexington County: Pop. 12,528
Irmo: Pop. 11,097 (partly on Lake Murray)
Forest Acres: Pop. 10,361
Blythewood, Richland/Fairfield County: Pop. 4,446
Woodfield, Richland County: Pop. 9,303 (unincorporated)
Red Bank, Lexington County: Pop. 9,617 (unincorporated)
Oak Grove, Lexington County: Pop.10,291 (unincorporated)
Camden, Kershaw County: Pop. 6,838
Lugoff, Kershaw County: Pop. 7,434 (unincorporated)

Neighborhoods

Demographics

2020 census

As of the 2020 United States census, there were 136,632 people, 45,474 households, and 22,243 families residing in the city.

2010 census
As of the census of 2010, there were 129,272 people, 52,471 total households, and 22,638 families residing in the city. The population density was 928.6 people per square mile (358.5/km2). There were 46,142 housing units at an average density of 368.5 per square mile (142.3/km2). The racial makeup of the city was 51.27% White, 42.20% Black, 2.20% Asian, 0.25% Native American, 0.30% Pacific Islander, 1.50% from other races, and 2.00% from two or more races. Hispanic or Latino of any race were 4.30% of the population.

There were 45,666 households, out of which 22.4% had children under the age of 18 living with them, 28.7% were married couples living together, 17.1% had a female householder with no husband present, and 50.4% were nonfamilies. 38.0% of all households were made up of individuals, and 8.9% had someone living alone who was 65 years of age or older. The average household size was 2.18 and the average family size was 2.94.

In the city, the population was spread out, with 20.1% under the age of 18, 22.9% from 18 to 24, 30.1% from 25 to 44, 16.6% from 45 to 64, and 10.3% who were 65 years of age or older. The median age was 29 years. For every 100 females, there were 96.2 males. For every 100 females age 18 and over, there were 93.4 males.

The median income for a household in the city was $31,141, and the median income for a family was $39,589. Males had a median income of $30,925 versus $24,679 for females. The per capita income for the city was $18,853. About 17.0% of families and 22.1% of the population were below the poverty line, including 29.7% of those under the age of 18 and 16.9% ages 65 or older.

Religion
The Southern Baptist Convention has 241 congregations and 115,000 members. The United Methodist Church has 122 congregations and 51,000 members. The Evangelical Lutheran Church has 71 congregations and 25,400 members. The PC (USA) has 34 congregations and 15,000 members; the Presbyterian Church in America has 22 congregations and 8,000 members. Columbia is see city of the Episcopal Diocese of Upper South Carolina, and Trinity Episcopal Cathedral is located across the street from the state capitol. The Catholic Church has 14 parishes, including the Basilica of Saint Peter, the state's only minor basilica and the 85th church in the U.S. to receive this designation from the Vatican. There are three Jewish synagogues. There are three different Islamic musjids providing places of worship for more than 600 Muslim families living in Columbia. There is one Greek Orthodox Church in Columbia. There are two Hindu Temples in the city, Hindu Temple of South Carolina and BAPS Shri Swaminarayan Mandir Columbia.

Economy

Columbia enjoys a diversified economy, with the major employers in the area being South Carolina state government, the Palmetto Health hospital system, Blue Cross Blue Shield of South Carolina, Palmetto GBA, and the University of South Carolina. Other major employers in the Columbia area include Computer Sciences Corporation, Fort Jackson, the U.S. Army's largest and most active initial entry training installation, Richland School District One, Humana/TriCare, and the United Parcel Service, which operates its Southeastern Regional Hub at the Columbia Metropolitan Airport. Major manufacturers such as Square D, CMC Steel, Spirax Sarco, Michelin, International Paper, Pirelli Cables, Honeywell, Westinghouse Electric, Harsco Track Tech, Trane, Intertape Polymer Group, Union Switch & Signal, FN Herstal, Solectron, and Bose Technology have facilities in the Columbia area. There are over 70 foreign affiliated companies and fourteen Fortune 500 companies in the region.

Several companies have their global, continental, or national headquarters in Columbia, including Colonial Life & Accident Insurance Company, the second-largest supplemental insurance company in the nation; the Ritedose Corporation, a pharmaceutical industry services company; AgFirst Farm Credit Bank, the largest bank headquartered in the state with over $30 billion in assets (the non-commercial bank is part of the Farm Credit System, the largest agricultural lending organization in the United States which was established by Congress in 1916); South State Bank, the largest commercial bank headquartered in South Carolina; Nexsen Pruet, LLC, a multi-specialty business law firm in the Carolinas; Spectrum Medical, an international medical software company; Wilbur Smith Associates, a full-service transportation and infrastructure consulting firm; and Nelson Mullins, a major national law firm. CSC's Financial Services Group, a major provider of software and outsourcing services to the insurance industry, is headquartered in the Columbia suburb of Blythewood.

Downtown revitalization

The city of Columbia has recently accomplished a number of urban redevelopment projects and has several more planned. The historic Congaree Vista, a  district running from the central business district toward the Congaree River, features a number of historic buildings that have been rehabilitated since its revitalization begun in the late 1980s. Of note is the adaptive reuse of the Confederate Printing Plant on Gervais and Huger, used to print Confederate bills during the American Civil War. The city cooperated with Publix grocery stores to preserve the look. This won Columbia an award from the International Downtown Association. The Vista district is also where the region's convention center and anchor Hilton hotel with a Ruth's Chris Steakhouse restaurant are located. Other notable developments under construction and recently completed include high-end condos and townhomes, hotels, and mixed-use structures.

The older buildings lining the Vista's main thoroughfare, Gervais Street, now house art galleries, restaurants, unique shops, and professional office space. Near the end of Gervais is the South Carolina State Museum and the EdVenture Children's Museum. Private student housing and some residential projects are going up nearby; the CanalSide development at the site of the old Central Correctional Institution, is the most high-profile. Completed in 2018, CanalSide is a 23-acre mixed-use development in the Vista on the Congaree River and is home to 750 residential rental apartments: townhomes, condominiums and lofts. Lady Street between Huger and Assembly streets in the Vista and the Five Points neighborhood have undergone beautification projects, which mainly consisted of replacing curbs and gutters, and adding brick-paved sidewalks and angled parking.

Special revitalization efforts are being aimed at Main Street, which began seeing an exodus of department and specialty stores in the 1990s. The goal is to re-establish Main Street as a vibrant commercial and residential corridor, and the stretch of Main Street home to most businesses—-from Gervais to Blanding streets—-has been streetscaped in recent years. Notable developments completed in recent years along Main Street include an 18-story, $60 million tower at the high-profile corner of Main and Gervais streets, the renovation of the 1441 Main Street office building as the new Midlands headquarters for Wells Fargo Bank (formerly Wachovia Bank), a new sanctuary for the Holy Trinity Greek Orthodox Church, the location of Mast General store in the historic Efird's building, and the relocation of the Nickelodeon theater. A façade improvement program for the downtown business district, implemented in 2011, has resulted in the restoration and improvement of the façades of several historic Main Street shopfronts. One of the most ambitious development projects in the city's history is currently underway which involves old state mental health campus downtown on Bull Street. Known formally as Columbia Common, this project will consist of rehabbing several historic buildings on the campus, as well as constructing new buildings, for residential, hospitality, and retail use. A minor league baseball stadium was built on the campus in 2016. Named Segra Park, it is home to the Columbia Fireflies.

Soda City Market

In November 2005, the Soda City Market, an outdoor market, was established as part of Main Street's revitalization. Every Saturday from 9:00 a.m. to 1 p.m., Main Street is closed to vehicular traffic. On average, 150 vendors sell at the market each week, and it is estimated that approximately 5,000 shoppers attend. The market contributes approximately 5 million dollars in sales annually. Items sold are typically handmade and local, including produce, cuisine, paintings, jewelry, and other crafted items.

Military installations
Fort Jackson is the U.S. Army's largest training post.
McEntire Joint National Guard Station is under command of the South Carolina Air National Guard.

Arts and culture

 Town Theatre is the country's oldest community theatre in continuous use. Located a block from the University of South Carolina campus, its playhouse is listed on the National Register of Historic Places. Since 1917, the theatre has produced plays and musicals of wide general appeal.
Trustus Theatre is Columbia's professional theatre company. Founded more than 20 years ago, Trustus brought a new dimension to theatre in South Carolina's capital city. Patrons have the opportunity to watch new shows directly from the stages of New York as well as classic shows rarely seen in Columbia.
The Nickelodeon Theater is a 2 screen, store front theater located on Main Street between Taylor and Blanding Streets. In operation since 1979, "the Nick", run by the Columbia Film Society, is home to two film screenings each evening and an additional matinée three days a week. The Nick is the only non-profit art house film theater in South Carolina and is the home for 25,000 filmgoers each year.
Columbia Marionette Theatre has the distinction of being the only free standing theatre in the nation devoted entirely to marionette arts.
The South Carolina Shakespeare Company performs the plays of Shakespeare and other classical works throughout the state.
Workshop Theatre of South Carolina opened in 1967 as a place where area directors could practice their craft. The theatre produces musicals and Broadway fare and also brings new theatrical material to Columbia.
The South Carolina State Museum is a comprehensive museum with exhibits in science, technology, history, and the arts. It is the state's largest museum and one of the largest museums in the Southeast.
The Columbia Museum of Art features changing exhibits throughout the year. Located at the corner of Hampton and Main Streets, the museum offers art, lectures, films, and guided tours.
EdVenture is one of the South's largest children's museums and the second largest in South Carolina. It is located next to the South Carolina State Museum on Gervais Street. The museum allows children to explore and learn while having fun.
McKissick Museum is located on the University of South Carolina campus. The museum features changing exhibitions of art, science, regional history, and folk art.
The South Carolina Confederate Relic Room & Military Museum showcases an artifact collection from the Colonial period to the space age. The museum houses a diverse collection of artifacts from the South Carolina confederate period. It is located in the South Carolina State Museum building.
The Richland County Public Library, named the 2001 National Library of the Year, serves area citizens through its main library and nine branches. The  main library has a large book collection, provides reference services, utilizes the latest technology, houses a children's collection, and displays artwork.
The South Carolina State Library provides library services to all citizens of South Carolina through the interlibrary loan service utilized by the public libraries located in each county.
The Columbia City Ballet is Columbia's ballet company, offering more than 80 major performances annually. Artistic director William Starrett, formerly of the Joffrey Ballet and American Ballet Theatre, runs the company.
The South Carolina Philharmonic Orchestra is Columbia's resident orchestra. The Philharmonic produces a full season of orchestral performances each year. Renowned musicians come to Columbia to perform as guest artists with the orchestra. In April 2008 Morihiko Nakahara was named the new music director of the Philharmonic.
The Columbia City Jazz Dance Company, formed in 1990 by artistic director Dale Lam, was named one of the "Top 50 Dance Companies in the USA" by Dance Spirit magazine. Columbia City Jazz specializes in modern, lyrical, and percussive jazz dance styles and has performed locally, regionally, and nationally in exhibitions, competitions, community functions, and international tours in Singapore, Plovdiv, Bulgaria, and Austria.
The Palmetto Opera debuted in 2003 with a performance of "Love, Murder & Revenge," a mixture of scenes from famous operas. The organization's mission is to present professional opera to the Midlands and South Carolina.
The Columbia Choral Society has been performing throughout the community since 1930. Under the direction of Dr. William Carswell, the group strives to stimulate and broaden interest in musical activities and to actively engage in the rehearsal and rendition of choral music.
Alternacirque is a professional circus that produces variety shows and full-scale themed productions. Formed in 2007, Alternacirque is directed by Natalie Brown.
Busted Plug Plaza is the location of Busted Plug, the world's largest fire hydrant. The sculpture was erected in 2001 by Columbia artist known as Blue Sky. The sculpture is located on Taylor Street in downtown Columbia.
Pocket Productions is an arts organization devoted to inspiring and expanding the arts community in Columbia, SC, through ArtRageous, Playing After Dark and other community-based collaborative events.

Movies filmed in the Columbia area include The Program, Renaissance Man, Chasers, Death Sentence, A Guy Named Joe, and Accidental Love/Nailed.

Venues

Columbia Metropolitan Convention Center
Located in the historic Congaree Vista district, this facility is close to restaurants, antique and specialty shops, art galleries, and various nightlife venues. The facility is located next to the Colonial Life Arena.

Koger Center for the Arts
Koger Center for the Arts provides Columbia with theatre, music, and dance performances that range from local acts to global acts. The facility seats 2,256 persons. The center is named for philanthropists Ira and Nancy Koger, who made a substantial donation from personal and corporate funds for construction of the $15 million center. The first performance at the Koger Center was given by the London Philharmonic Orchestra and took place on Saturday, January 14, 1989. The facility is known for hosting diverse events, from the State of the State Address to the South Carolina Body Building Championship and the South Carolina Science Fair.

Carolina Coliseum

Carolina Coliseum, which opened in 1968, is a 12,401-seat facility which initially served as the home of the USC Gamecocks' basketball teams. The arena could be easily adapted to serve other entertainment purposes, including concerts, car shows, circuses, ice shows, and other events. The versatility and quality of the coliseum at one time allowed the university to use the facility for performing arts events such as the Boston Pops, Chicago Symphony, Feld Ballet, and other performances by important artists. An acoustical shell and a state-of-the-art lighting system assisted the coliseum in presenting such activities. The coliseum was the home of the Columbia Inferno, an ECHL team. However, since the construction of the Colonial Life Arena in 2002, the coliseum now is the center for the men's and women's basketball programs, with the center arena now housing the two main practice courts.

Township Auditorium
Township Auditorium seats 3,099 capacity and is located in downtown Columbia. The Georgian Revival building was designed by the Columbia architectural firm of Lafaye and Lafaye and constructed in 1930. The Township has hosted thousands of events from concerts to conventions to wrestling matches. The auditorium was listed in the National Register of Historic Places on September 28, 2005, and has recently undergone a $12 million extensive interior and exterior renovation.

Sports
The most popular sports in Columbia are the sports programs at the University of South Carolina. Columbia also offers minor league, semi-pro, and amateur sports. In April 2017 the women's Gamecocks basketball team won the NCAA national championship, defeating Mississippi State 67–55.

Columbia has also hosted the women's U.S. Olympic Marathon Trials in 1996 and 2000 and the 2007 Junior Wildwater World Championships, which featured many European canoe and kayak racers. The Colonial Life Arena has also hosted NBA exhibition games.

Sports venues
Williams-Brice Stadium is the home of the USC Gamecocks' football team and is the 24th largest college football stadium in the nation. It seats 80,250 people and is located just south of downtown Columbia. The stadium was built in 1934 with the help of federal Works Progress Administration funds, and initially seated 17,600. The original name was Carolina Stadium, but on September 9, 1972, it was renamed to honor the Williams and Brice families. Mrs. Martha Williams-Brice had left much of her estate to the university for stadium renovations and expansions. Her late husband, Thomas H. Brice, played football for the university from 1922 to 1924.

Colonial Life Arena, opened in 2002; it has 18,000 seats for college basketball, it is the largest arena in the state of South Carolina, serving as the home of the men's and women's USC Gamecocks basketball teams. Located on the University of South Carolina campus, this facility features 41 suites, four entertainment suites, and the Frank McGuire Club, a full-service hospitality room with a capacity of 300. The facility has padded seating, a sound system, and a four-sided video scoreboard.

The $13 million Charlie W. Johnson Stadium is the home of Benedict College football and soccer. The structure was completed and dedicated in 2006 and seats 11,000 with a maximum capacity of 16,000.

The Founders Park opened in 2009. Seating 8,400 permanently for college baseball and an additional 1,000 for standing room only, it is the largest baseball stadium in the state of South Carolina. It serves as the home of the University of South Carolina Gamecocks' baseball team. Located near Granby Park near downtown Columbia, this facility features entertainment suites, a picnic terrace, and a dining deck. The facility also features a sound system and scoreboard.

On January 6, 2015, developers broke ground on the $37 million Segra Park. The stadium is the home for the Columbia Fireflies, a Minor League Baseball team playing in the Low-A East. It opened in April 2016 and can seat up to 7,501 people. Columbia had been without minor league baseball since the Capital City Bombers relocated to Greenville, South Carolina, in 2004.

Parks and recreation

Finlay Park has hosted events from festivals and political rallies to road races and Easter Sunrise services. This  park has had two lives; first dedicated in 1859 as Sidney Park, named in honor of Algernon Sidney Johnson, a Columbia City Councilman, the park experienced an illustrious but short tenure. The park fell into disrepair after the Civil War and served as a site for commercial ventures until the late 20th century. In 1990, the park was reopened. It serves as the site for such events as Kids Day, The Summer Concert Series, plus many more activities. In 1992, the park was renamed Finlay Park, in honor of Kirkman Finlay, a past mayor of Columbia who had a vision to reenergize the historic Congaree Vista district, between Main Street and the river, and recreate the site that was formerly known as Sidney Park. The  city has plans for an $18 million upgrade of the park in the near future which will include a redesigned parking lot near Laurel Street; a significant overhaul of the pond; construction of a pair of scenic streams; brand new shelters, restrooms, plazas, and performance stage; new waterfall features; and a new, large playground with a splash pad.

Memorial Park is a  tract of land in the Congaree Vista between Main Street and the river. The property is bordered by Hampton, Gadsden, Washington, and Wayne Streets and is one block south of Finlay Park. This park was created to serve as a memorial to those who served their country and presently has monuments honoring the USS Columbia warship and those that served with her during World War II, the China-Burma-India Theater Veterans of WWII, casualties of the Pearl Harbor attack of December 7, 1941, who were from South Carolina, Holocaust survivors who live in South Carolina as well as concentration camp liberators from South Carolina, and the State Vietnam War Veterans. The park was dedicated in November 1986 along with the unveiling of the South Carolina Vietnam Monument. In June 2000, the Korean War Memorial was dedicated at Memorial Park. In November 2014, Columbia native and resident of Boston, Henry Crede, gave a bronze statue and plaza in the park dedicated to his WWII comrades who served in the Navy from South Carolina.

Granby Park opened in November 1998 as a gateway to the rivers of Columbia, adding another access to the many river activities available to residents. Granby is part of the Three Rivers Greenway, a system of green spaces along the banks of the rivers in Columbia, adding another piece to the long-range plan and eventually connecting to the existing Riverfront Park. Granby is a  linear park with canoe access points, fishing spots, bridges, and ½ mile of nature trail along the banks of the Congaree River.

In the Five Points district of downtown Columbia is the park dedicated to the legacy and memory of civil rights leader, Martin Luther King Jr. Formerly known as Valley Park, it was renamed in the late 1980s. The park features a water sculpture and a community center. An integral element of the park is the Stone of Hope monument, unveiled in January 1996. The monument is inscribed with a portion of King's 1964 Nobel Peace Prize acceptance speech: "History is cluttered with the wreckage of nations and individuals that pursued that self-defeating path of hate. Love is the key to the solutions of the problems of the world."

One of Columbia's greatest assets is Riverbanks Zoo & Garden. Riverbanks Zoo is a sanctuary for more than 2,000 animals housed in natural habitat exhibits along the Saluda River. Just across the river, the  botanical garden is devoted to gardens, woodlands, plant collections, and historic ruins. Riverbanks has been named one of America's best zoos and the No. 1 travel attraction in the Southeast. It attracted over one million visitors in 2009.

Situated along the meandering Congaree River in central South Carolina, Congaree National Park is home to champion trees, primeval forest landscapes, and diverse plant and animal life. This  park protects the largest contiguous tract of old-growth bottomland hardwood forest remaining in the United States. The park is an international biosphere reserve. Known for its giant hardwoods and towering pines, the park's floodplain forest includes one of the highest canopies in the world and some of the tallest trees in the eastern United States. Congaree National Park provides a sanctuary for plants and animals, a research site for scientists, and a place to walk and relax in a tranquil wilderness setting.

Sesquicentennial State Park is a  park, featuring a  lake surrounded by trails and picnic areas. The park's proximity to downtown Columbia and three major interstate highways attracts both local residents and travelers. Sesquicentennial is often the site of family reunions and group campouts. Interpretive nature programs are a major attraction to the park. The park also contains a two-story log house, dating back to the mid 18th century, which was relocated to the park in 1969. This house is believed to be the oldest building still standing in Richland County. The park was originally built by the Civilian Conservation Corps in the 1930s. Evidence of their craftsmanship is still present today.

In November 1996, the River Alliance proposed that a  linear park system be created to link people to their rivers. This was named the Three Rivers Greenway, and the $18 million estimated cost was agreed to by member governments (the cities of Cayce, Columbia, and West Columbia) with the proviso that the Alliance recommend an acceptable funding strategy.

While the funding process was underway, an existing city of Columbia site located on the Congaree River offered an opportunity to be a pilot project for the Three Rivers Greenway. The Alliance was asked to design and permit for construction by a general contractor this component. This approximately one-half-mile segment of the system was opened in November 1998. These set the standards for the common elements in the rest of the system. Eventually, pathways will run from Granby to the Riverbanks Zoo. Boaters, sportspeople, and fisherpeople will have access to the area, and additional recreational uses are being planned along the miles of riverfront.

Running beside the historic Columbia Canal, Riverfront Park hosts a two and a half-mile trail. Spanning the canal is an old railway bridge that now is a pedestrian walkway. The park is used for walking, running, bicycling, and fishing. Picnic tables and benches dot the walking trail. Markers are located along the trail so that visitors can measure distance. The park is part of the Palmetto Trail, a hiking and biking trail that stretches the entire length of the state, from Greenville to Charleston.

Other parks in the Columbia area include:
W. Gordon Belser Arboretum
Maxcy Gregg Park
Hyatt Park
Earlewood Park
Granby Park
Owens Field Park
Guignard Park
Southeast Park
Harbison State Forest

Government

The city of Columbia has a council-manager form of government. The mayor and city council are elected every four years, with no term limits. Elections are held in the spring. Unlike other mayors in council-manager systems, the Columbia mayor has the power to veto ordinances passed by the council; vetoes can be overridden by a two-thirds majority of the council, which appoints a city manager to serve as chief administrative officer. The current mayor is Daniel Rickenmann, who succeeded Stephen K. Benjamin on January 4, 2022.

The city council consists of six members, four from districts and two elected at-large. The city council is responsible for making policies and enacting laws, rules, and regulations in order to provide for future community and economic growth, in addition to providing the necessary support for the orderly and efficient operation of city services.

At-Large
Aditi Bussells
Howard Duvall Jr.

Districts
1: Tina N. Herbert
2: Edward McDowell, Jr.
3: Will Brennan
4: Vacant until a March 28, 2023 special election, with death of incumbent Joe E. Taylor, Jr.

See related article Past mayors of Columbia, South Carolina

The city's police force is the Columbia Police Department. The chief of police answers to the city manager. Presently, the chief of police is W.H. "Skip" Holbrook; Holbrook was sworn in on April 11, 2014.

The South Carolina Department of Corrections, headquartered in Columbia, operates several correctional facilities in Columbia. They include the Broad River Correctional Institution, the Goodman Correctional Institution, the Camille Griffin Graham Correctional Institution, the Stevenson Correctional Institution, and the Campbell Pre-Release Center. Graham houses the state's female death row. The state of South Carolina's execution chamber is located at Broad River. From 1990 to 1997, Broad River housed the state's male death row.

Education

Colleges and universities
Columbia is home to the main campus of the University of South Carolina, which was chartered in 1801 as South Carolina College and in 1906 as the University of South Carolina. The university has 350 degree programs and enrolls 31,964 students throughout fifteen degree-granting colleges and schools. It is an urban university, located in downtown Columbia. It is home to the Darla Moore School of Business, which has had the No. 1 undergraduate international business degree for 20 consecutive years.

Columbia is also home to:
Allen University – Allen University was founded in 1870 by the African Methodist Episcopal Church. Allen University is accredited by the Commission on Colleges of the Southern Association of Colleges and Schools (SACS) to award baccalaureate degrees.
Benedict College – Founded in 1870, Benedict is an independent coeducational college. Benedict is one of the fastest growing of the 39 United Negro College Fund schools. In addition to an increase in enrollment, Benedict has also seen an increase in average SAT scores, Honors College enrollee rates, capital giving dollars, and the number of research grants awarded. Recently, Benedict has been subject to a series of recent controversies, including basing up to 60 percent of grades solely on effort, which have nearly resulted in its losing its accreditation. However, in recent months the college has improved its financial standing and is seeking to boost its enrollment.
Columbia College – Founded in 1854, Columbia College is a private, four-year, liberal arts college for women with a coeducational Evening College and Graduate School. The college has been ranked since 1994 by U.S. News & World Report as one of the top ten regional liberal arts colleges in the South.
Columbia International University is a biblically based, private Christian institution committed to "preparing men and women to know Christ and to make Him known."
ECPI University has specialized in student-centered technology, business, criminal justice, and health science for 47 years – A leading private university offering master's, bachelor's, associate degree and diploma programs. Continuing Education certification programs are also available. ECPI University is accredited by the Commission on Colleges of the Southern Association of Colleges and Schools to award associate, baccalaureate, and master's degrees and diploma programs. ECPI University Columbia campus also has programmatic accreditation for Medical Assisting with the Accrediting Bureau of Health Education Schools.
Lutheran Theological Southern Seminary – This institution, founded in 1830, is a seminary of the Evangelical Lutheran Church in America. One of the oldest Lutheran seminaries in North America, Southern is a fully accredited graduate school of theology preparing women and men for the ordained and lay ministries of the church. The wooded  campus is situated atop Seminary Ridge in Columbia, the highest point in the Midlands area, near the geographic center of the city.
Midlands Technical College – Midlands Tech is part of the South Carolina Technical College System. It is a two-year, comprehensive, public, community college, offering a wide variety of programs in career education, four-year college-transfer options, and continuing education. Small classes, individualized instruction, and student support services are provided. Most of the college's teaching faculty holds master's or doctoral degrees.
Fortis College – Fortis College is part of the Educational Affiliates Inc, and offers many different career-based degrees.
South Carolina School of Leadership – Established in 2006, South Carolina School of Leadership (SCSL) is a post-secondary "gap year" school with an intense focus on Christian discipleship and leadership development. SCSL uses curriculum from Southeastern University.
Virginia College – Virginia College received senior college recognition from the Accrediting Council for Independent Colleges and Schools (ACICS) which now accredits all programs at the school's campuses

Columbia is also the site of several extension campuses, including those for Erskine Theological Seminary, South University, and the University of Phoenix.

Public school districts
Most of the city of Columbia is within Richland County School District One. Portions in Fort Jackson are served by the Department of Defense Education Activity (DoDEA) for elementary grades, with Richland County School District Two serving that area for secondary grades. Small portions are within Richland County School District Two for grades K-12, and Lexington & Richland County School District Five.

Private schools

Ben Lippen School (PK-12)
Bethel Learning Centers (PK-1)
Cardinal Newman (7-12)
Cutler Jewish Day School (PK-5)
Covenant Classical Christian School (K-12)
Glenforest School (3-12)
Grace Christian School (PK-12)
Hammond School (PK-12)
Harmony School (PK-5)
Heathwood Hall (PK-12)
Heritage Christian Academy (PK-9)
Montessori School of Columbia (PK-6)
New Heights School (PK-6)
Northside Christian Academy (PK-12)
Sandhills School (1-12)
Saint John Neumann Catholic School (PK-6)
Saint Joseph Catholic School (PK-6)
Saint Martin de Porres Catholic School (PK-6)
Saint Peter's Catholic School (PK-6)
Timmerman School (PK-8)
V.V. Reid Elementary (PK-3)

Supplementary schools
South Carolina Japanese Language Supplementary School (サウスカロライナ日本語補習校 Sausu Karoraina Nihongo Hoshūkō)/Matsuba Gakuen (松葉学園) is a weekend school for Japanese children, operating with Japanese government funds, held on the USC Campus in Columbia. "Matsuba" means "Pine Needle". In April 1985 the school was established. In 1989 its students were ages 3–16.

Media

Columbia's daily newspaper is The State. The Post and Courier of Charleston, which bought the alt weekly "Free Times," also circulates in the city, and the "Free Times" has become an insert in its editions.

Cola Daily, is a digital newsroom affiliated with Midlands Media Group, which also owns two radio stations.

Alternative newspapers include The Columbia Star, Carolina Panorama Newspaper, and SC Black News.

Columbia Metropolitan Magazine is a bi-monthly publication about news and events in the metropolitan area. Greater Columbia Business Monthly highlights economic development, business, education, and the arts. Q-Notes, a bi-weekly newspaper serving the LGBT community and published in Charlotte, is distributed to locations in Columbia and via home delivery.

Columbia is home to the headquarters and production facilities of South Carolina Educational Television and South Carolina Public Radio, the state's public television and public radio networks.

Columbia has the 78th largest television market in the United States. Network affiliates include WIS (NBC), WLTX (CBS), WACH (Fox) and WOLO (ABC).

Infrastructure

Transportation

Mass transit

The Comet, officially the Central Midlands Regional Transit Authority, is the agency responsible for operating mass transit in the greater Columbia area including Cayce, West Columbia, Forest Acres, Arcadia Lakes, Springdale, Lexington and the St. Andrews area. COMET operates express shuttles, as well as bus service serving Columbia and its immediate suburbs. The authority was established in October 2002 after SCANA released ownership of public transportation back to the city of Columbia. Since 2003, COMET has provided transportation for more than 2 million passengers, has expanded route services, and introduced 43 new ADA accessible buses offering a safer, more comfortable means of transportation. CMRTA has also added 10 natural gas powered buses to the fleet. Comet went under a name change and rebranding project in 2013. Before then, the system was called the Columbia Metropolitan Rapid Transit Association or "CMRTA". Additionally, Blue Cross Blue Shield provides rental bicycles in downtown Columbia.

The Central Midlands Council of Governments is in the process of investigating the potential for rail transit in the region. Routes into downtown Columbia originating from Camden, Newberry, and Batesburg-Leesville are in consideration, as is a potential line between Columbia and Charlotte connecting the two mainlines of the future Southeastern High Speed Rail Corridor.

Roads and highways

Columbia's central location between the population centers of South Carolina has made it a transportation focal point with three interstate highways and one interstate spur.

Interstates:
 I-26 Interstate 26 travels from northwest to southeast and connects Columbia to the other two major population centers of South Carolina: the Greenville-Spartanburg area in the northwestern part of the state and North Charleston – Charleston area in the southeastern part of the state. It also serves the nearby towns and suburbs of Irmo, Harbison, Gaston, and Swansea.
 I-20 Interstate 20 travels from west to east and connects Columbia to Atlanta and Augusta in the west and Florence in the east. It serves the nearby towns and suburbs of Pelion, Lexington, West Columbia, the Sandhill region, Pontiac, Elgin, Lugoff, and Camden. Interstate 20 is also used by travelers heading to Myrtle Beach, although the interstate's eastern terminus is in Florence.
 I-77 (William Earle Berne Beltway) Interstate 77 begins at a junction with Interstate 26 south of Columbia and travels north to Rock Hill and Charlotte. This interstate also provides direct access to Fort Jackson, the U.S. Army's largest training base and one of Columbia's largest employers. It serves the nearby towns and suburbs of Forest Acres, Gadsden, and Blythewood.
 I-126 Interstate 126 begins downtown at Elmwood Avenue and travels west towards Interstate 26 and Interstate 20. It provides access to Riverbanks Zoo.

US routes:
 U.S. 1
 U.S. 21
 U.S. 76
 U.S. 176
 U.S. 321
 U.S. 378

State highways:
 SC 12
 SC 16
 SC 48
 SC 215
 SC 262
 SC 277
 SC 555
 SC 760
 SC 768

Air

The city and its surroundings are served by Columbia Metropolitan Airport . The airport itself is serviced by American Eagle, Delta Connection, and United Express airlines. In addition, the city is also served by the much smaller Jim Hamilton–L.B. Owens Airport  located in the Rosewood neighborhood. It serves as the county airport for Richland County and offers general aviation.

Intercity rail

The city is served daily by Amtrak station, with the Silver Star trains connecting Columbia with New York City, Washington, DC, Savannah, Jacksonville, Orlando, Tampa, and Miami. The station is located at 850 Pulaski St.

Until 1959 the Southern Railway's Skyland Special (Asheville, North Carolina - Jacksonville, Florida) made a stop in Columbia's Union Station. Until 1966 the Southern Railway's Augusta Special went north from Columbia Union Station to New York City via Charlotte, North Carolina and went west to Augusta, Georgia's Union Station, where passengers could make connections to Georgia Railroad trains to Atlanta, Georgia. The Charleston branch of the Southern's Carolina Special made a stop in Columbia. Until 1954 a regional Atlantic Coast Line Railroad train went to Florence and Wilmington.

Intercity bus

Greyhound Lines formerly operated a station on Gervais Street, in the eastern part of downtown, providing Columbia with intercity bus transportation. The station relocated to 710 Buckner Road in February 2015.

MegaBus began operations in Columbia in 2015. There routes include stops in Atlanta, Fayetteville, North Carolina, Richmond, Virginia, Washington, DC, and New York City, New York. The station is located on Sumter Street.

Health care

The Sisters of Charity Providence Hospitals is sponsored by the Sisters of Charity of Saint Augustine Health System, a non-profit organization licensed for 304 beds which operates four hospitals, including Providence Hospital in downtown Columbia founded in 1938, Providence Heart Institute, Providence Hospital Northeast, and Providence Orthopaedic and NeuroSpine Institute.

Prisma Health is a private nonprofit health company and the largest healthcare organization in South Carolina that was formed by the joining of Palmetto Health and Greenville Health System in 2019. The company has 29,500 team members, 18 acute and specialty hospitals, 2,947 beds, 300 outpatient sites, and more than 5,100 employed and independent clinicians across its clinically integrated inVio Health Network. Prisma Health serves almost 1.5 million unique patients annually in its 21-county market area that covers 50% of South Carolina. Prisma Health hospitals in Columbia include the Midlands' only Level 1 trauma center and academic medical center, Richland Hospital, as well as Children's Hospital and the Heart Hospital also on the Richland Campus, Baptist Hospital and Baptist Parkridge Hospital.

Lexington Medical Center, opened in 1971, is a network of hospitals and urgent care centers located throughout Lexington County, with one location in Columbia.

The Wm. Jennings Bryan Dorn VA Medical Center is a 216-bed facility, encompassing acute medical, surgical, psychiatric, and long-term care.

Renewable energy and climate goals 
Attaining 100 percent clean and renewable energy by 2036 is incorporated into the city's 67 climate goals. Projects include a solar farm to provide power for the wastewater treatment plant, an updated water metering system, reduction of water leaks, and replacement of polluting, city-owned vehicles.

Notable people

Accolades
Columbia has been the recipient of several awards and achievements. In October 2009, Columbia was listed in U.S. News & World Report as one of the best places to retire, citing location and median housing price as key contributors. As of July 2013 Columbia was named one of "10 Great Cities to Live In" by Kiplinger Magazine. Most recently, the city has been named a top mid-sized market in the nation for relocating families, as well as one of 30 communities named "America's Most Livable Communities," an award given by the non-profit Partners for Livable Communities.

Sister cities
The city of Columbia has seven sister cities:
 Kaiserslautern, Rhineland-Palatinate, Germany
 Cluj-Napoca, Romania
 Plovdiv, Bulgaria
 Chelyabinsk, Chelyabinsk Oblast, Russia
 Yibin, Sichuan, China
 Accra, Ghana
 Taichung City, Taiwan
An eighth sister city, Columbia, Mississippi, was added after mutual aid took place between the two cities following natural disasters and recognition of their linked histories.

See also

 List of capitals in the United States
 List of municipalities in South Carolina
 Columbia High School (Columbia, South Carolina)
 Columbia, Newberry and Laurens Railroad, historic railroad
 Columbia Record, former afternoon daily newspaper
 Columbia Speedway
 Columbia South Carolina Temple, an operating temple of The Church of Jesus Christ of Latter-day Saints
 Columbia Theological Seminary, formerly in Columbia, South Carolina, now in Decatur, Georgia
 George Stinney, youngest person to be executed in the United States
 List of tallest buildings in Columbia, South Carolina
 USS Columbia, at least 3 ships

Notes

References

Further reading
 Aboyan, Laura. Columbia Food: A History of Cuisine in the Famously Hot City (Arcadia Publishing, 2013).
 Allen, Katharine, and  Robert-John Hinojosa. "The LGBTQ Columbia History Initiative." History News. (Summer2021) 76#3 pp 19-23.
 Campbell, Jacqueline G. "'The most Diabolical Act of all the Barbarous War': Soldiers, Civilians, and the Burning of Columbia, February 1865." American Nineteenth Century History 3.3 (2002): 53-72.
 
 
 Driggers, E. A. "...The movement of a celestial system than a human invention': Abram Blanding and bringing water to Columbia." Water History 14.1 (2022): 21-40. online
 Edgar, Walter B., and Deborah Kohler Woolley. Columbia, Portrait of a City (Donning Company, 1986).

 . + Chronology
 Gatewood, Willard B. "" The Remarkable Misses Rollin": Black Women in Reconstruction South Carolina." South Carolina Historical Magazine 92.3 (1991): 172-188. online
 

 Haram, Kerstyn M. "The Palmetto Leader's Mission to End Lynching in South Carolina: Black Agency and the Black Press in Columbia, 1925-1940." South Carolina Historical Magazine 107.4 (2006): 310-333. online
 Heisser, David CR, and Stephen J. White Sr. Patrick N. Lynch, 1817-1882: Third Catholic Bishop of Charleston (Univ of South Carolina Press, 2015) online.

 Helsley, Alexia Jones. Columbia, South Carolina: A history (Arcadia Publishing, 2015).

 Kahler, Sophie, and Conor Harrison. "‘Wipe out the entire slum area’: University-led Urban Renewal in Columbia, South Carolina, 1950–1985." Journal of Historical Geography 67 (2020): 61-70.

Latzko, David A. "Mapping the Short-run impact of the civil War and emancipation on the South Carolina economy." South Carolina Historical Magazine (2015): 258-279. online

 Lipscomb, Terry W. "The Legacy of Ainsley Hall." South Carolina Historical Magazine 99.2 (1998): 158-179. online

 Lockhart, Matthew A. " 'Under the Wings of Columbia': John Lewis Gervais as Architect of South Carolina's 1786 Capital Relocation Legislation." South Carolina Historical Magazine 104.3 (2003): 176-197. online
 Lofton, Paul. "The Columbia Black community in the 1930s."  Proceedings of the South Carolina Historical Association (1984), pp. 86-95. 
 

 , the major scholarly history.
 Myers, Andrew H. Black, White, & Olive Drab: Racial Integration at Fort Jackson, South Carolina, and the Civil Rights Movement (University of Virginia Press, 2006).
 Newell, Jonathan. "Billy Sunday's 1923 Evangelistic Campaign in Columbia, South Carolina." Conference Proceedings of the South Carolina Historical Association (2008), pp. 45-54.
 Sherrer, John. "Fancy and Fine, Plain and Simple" Journal of Early Southern Decorative Arts  (2005), Vol. 31/32 Issue 2/1&2, pp.1-26.  About  the cabinetmakers of Columbia and Richland Country and the wares manufactured from 1800 until 1860.
 Smith, F. De Vere. "The Columbia Mills: the first electrically operated mills in the United States." Textile History Review (1964) 5#3 pp 84-95. 

 Stowell, David O. "The Free Black Population of Columbia, South Carolina in 1860: A Snapshot of Occupation and Personal Wealth." South Carolina Historical Magazine 104.1 (2003): 6-24. online

Primary sources
 Elmore, Grace Brown, ed. A Heritage of Woe: The Civil War Diary of Grace Brown Elmore, 1861-1868 (University of Georgia Press, 1997).

External links

 
 

 
1787 establishments in South Carolina
Cities in Lexington County, South Carolina
Cities in Richland County, South Carolina
Cities in South Carolina
Columbia metropolitan area (South Carolina)
County seats in South Carolina
Planned cities in the United States
Populated places established in 1787